The Taiwan Area National Expressway Engineering Bureau (TANEEB) was the organization under the Ministry of Transportation and Communications of the Republic of China in charge for the planning, land acquisition, bidding and construction of national expressway network in Taiwan.

History
TANEEB was established on 5 January 1990 due to the increasing flow of vehicles after the opening of the first freeway in 1978.

On 12 February 2018, it was merged into the Freeway Bureau.

See also
 Ministry of Transportation and Communications (Republic of China)
 Highway system in Taiwan

References

1990 establishments in Taiwan
2018 disestablishments in Taiwan
Executive Yuan
Defunct organizations based in Taiwan